Desulfobacter vibrioformis is a sulfate-reducing bacteria. It is mesophilic, gram-negative, vibrio-shaped, marine and acetate-oxidizing.

References

Further reading

External links

LPSN
Type strain of Desulfobacter vibrioformis at BacDive -  the Bacterial Diversity Metadatabase

Desulfobacterales
Bacteria described in 1997